Eurysternidae is an extinct family of turtles in the clade Thalassochelydia. It consists of several genera of marine turtles from marine deposits in Europe, including Achelonia, Chelonides, Eurysternum. Hydropelta, Chelonides, Idiochelys, Palaeomedusa, Parachelys. and Solnhofia.

References

Thalassochelydia
Prehistoric reptile families
Late Jurassic turtles
Late Jurassic reptiles of Europe
Taxa named by Louis Dollo